Burwell Boykin Lewis (July 7, 1838 – October 11, 1885) represented both Alabama's 6th congressional district and Alabama's At-large congressional district in the United States House of Representatives.

Early life 
Lewis was born in Montgomery, Alabama and soon moved, with his parents, to Mobile, Alabama. Both parents died while in  Mobile and young Lewis went to Montevallo, Alabama in Shelby County, Alabama to live with an uncle. While there he attended private schools. Upon completion he moved to Tuscaloosa where he attended the University of Alabama. He next moved to Selma where he studied law. Lewis was admitted to the bar in 1859 and began to practice law in Montevallo. With the outbreak of the American Civil War Lewis enlisted in the Confederate States Army. He served with the Second Alabama Cavalry and attained the rank of captain.

Political life 
Lewis was elected to the Alabama House of Representatives from 1870 to 1872. He moved to Tuscaloosa where he engaged in business activities before being elected to an at-large seat in the United States House of Representatives in 1875. This seat was to represent the 8th congressional district which was first apportioned as a result of the 1880 census. He was an unsuccessful candidate for the 1876 election but was elected to the 6th congressional district in 1878. He began his service in March 1879 and served until October 1880 when he resigned to serve as the president of the University of Alabama in Tuscaloosa.

Later life 
Lewis served as president of the UA for just over five years until his death in Tuscaloosa, in 1885.

References 

Biographical Directory of the United States Congress Burwell Boykin Lewis Accessed 21 April 2007

External links

1838 births
1885 deaths
Politicians from Montgomery, Alabama
Military personnel from Mobile, Alabama
People from Montevallo, Alabama
Presidents of the University of Alabama
Democratic Party members of the United States House of Representatives from Alabama
19th-century American politicians
Politicians from Mobile, Alabama
Lawyers from Mobile, Alabama
Lawyers from Montgomery, Alabama
Military personnel from Montgomery, Alabama
19th-century American lawyers